Anita Beryl (born 11 January 1986) is a Ugandan Fashion Designer, Couturier and Entrepreneur. She is the creative director of Beryl Qouture, a Ugandan fashion house. The Ugandan magazine, Satisfashion Uganda, named Beryl one of "The 40 Movers and Shakers of 2016", in December 2016.

Early life and education 
Anita was born to Rev. and Mrs. Ahabwe of Bushenyi district, and is the first-born of six children born to the couple. She attended Bweranyangyi Girls for O and A-level and left in 2005. She later joined Uganda Christian University, Mukono, for a Bachelor of Arts in Education, graduating in 2009. She attained her first fashion training at Uber Glam, in Johannesburg, South Africa, before joining, French Fashion University, ESMOD.

Career
In 2011, she founded Beryl Quoture By Anita Beryl, as a Haute Qouture and ready to wear clothing and accessory franchise for all genders Her label was invited to participate in local, regional and international fashion shows including "Accra Fashion Week", in Ghana and "Swahili Fashion Week" in Tanzania, in 2016 alone. In 2017, she was invited to showcase her design at the World Fashion Week 2017, in Kuala Lampur, Malaysia. Her expanding client base includes clients in Uganda, Kenya, Tanzania, South Africa, the United Kingdom and other countries. She has also showcased her design at fashion shows in Nigeria, Addis Ababa, Barcelona and Mombasa.

Fashion Showcases

Awards and recognition

References

External links
Photos: Uganda’s Anita Beryl Shines at Fashion Week in Barcelona As of 11 July 2017.

Living people
1986 births
21st-century Ugandan businesswomen
21st-century Ugandan businesspeople
Ugandan fashion designers
Uganda Christian University alumni
People educated at Bweranyangi Girls' Senior Secondary School
People from Western Region, Uganda
Ugandan women fashion designers